Central Academy of Technology and Arts (CATA) is a public high school located in Monroe, North Carolina, and also Union County's first magnet high school. Unlike regular public high schools, students at Central Academy have the opportunity to have a major course of study in an academy of their choice that will give them a head start towards their future careers in life. The academies include Information Systems (software, hardware, and cybersecurity), Medical Sciences, Performing Arts (theater, dance, and music production and recording arts), Pre-Engineering, and Transportation Systems. Teacher Preparation was eliminated before the 2015–2016 school year.

CATA is a part of Union County Public Schools, on Brewer Drive. The school was originally a career center, but now is a part of the public school system. The school was founded as a high school for grades 9–12 in 2006, with the first graduating class in 2009.

References

External links 
 Union County Public Schools

Public high schools in North Carolina
Schools in Union County, North Carolina
Magnet schools in North Carolina